In software development, a codebase (or code base) is a collection of source code used to build a particular software system, application, or software component. Typically, a codebase includes only human-written source code files; thus, a codebase usually does not include source code files generated by tools (generated files) or binary library files (object files), as they can be built from the human-written source code. However, it generally does include configuration and property files, as they are the data necessary for the build.

A codebase is typically stored in a source control repository in a version control system. A source code repository is a place where large amounts of source code are kept, either publicly or privately. Source code repositories are used most basically for backups and versioning, and on multi-developer projects to handle various source code versions and to provide aid in resolving conflicts that arise from developers submitting overlapping modifications. 

Subversion, Git and Mercurial are examples of popular tools used to handle this workflow, which are common in open source projects.

For smaller projects, its code may be kept as a non-managed set of files (even the Linux kernel was maintained as a set of files for many years).

Distinct and monolithic codebases 
This is particularly the case for related projects, such as those developed within the same company. In more detail, a monolithic codebase typically entails a single repository (all the code in one place), and often a common build system or common libraries. Whether the codebase is shared or split does not depend on the system architecture and actual build results; thus, a monolithic codebase, which is related to the actual development, does not entail a monolithic system, which is related to software architecture or a single monolithic binary. As a result, a monolithic codebase may and (for large codebases) often will consist of separate components, instead of carrying only a single system or single binary; a distributed codebase (with multiple components) can be used to build a single monolithic system or even a single binary. For example, the Linux kernel is architecturally a single monolithic kernel, but it consists of separate binaries (loadable components), and is developed in multiple distributed repositories.

There are both advantages and disadvantages to a monolithic codebase when it is compared to a distributed codebase. Most simply, a monolithic codebase simplifies integrationchanges to different components or refactoring of code between components can be done easily and atomicallyand allows operations across the entire codebase, but requires a larger repository and makes it easier to introduce wide-ranging technical debt. A separate codebase or a distributed codebase keeps individual repositories smaller and more manageable, enforcing at the same time separation between components, but it also requires integration between codebases (or with the main repository), and complicates changes that span multiple codebases.

In terms of standards, referring to multiple codebases as "distinct" declares that there are independent implementations without shared source code and that, historically, these implementations did not evolve from a common project. This may be a way of demonstrating interoperability by showing two independent pieces of software that implement a given standard.

Examples 
Some notably large codebases include:
 Google: monolithic, 1 billion files, 9 million source code files, 2 billion lines of source code, 35 million commits in total, 86 TB total size (January 2015)
 Facebook: monolithic, 8 GB (repo 54 GB including history, 2014), hundreds of thousands of files (2014)
 Linux kernel: distributed, over 15 million lines of code ( and kernel version 3.10)

See also 

 Codeplex
 Comparison of free software hosting facilities
 FishEye (software)
 Forge (software)
 List of free software project directories
 List of revision control software
 Snippet (programming)
 SourceForge.net

References 

Source code
Version control